Dorothy Creole was one of the first African women to arrive in New York.  She arrived in 1627. That year, three enslaved African women set foot on the southern shore of Manhattan, arriving in the Dutch colony of New Amsterdam (Nieuw Amsterdam).  Property of the Dutch West India Company, these women were brought to the colony to become the wives of enslaved African men who had arrived in 1625.  One of these women was named Dorothy Creole, a surname that she acquired in the New World.

Dorothy's world was one in which West Africans and Europeans had mixed and traded for more than two centuries.  The Dutch had established trading posts in present-day Angola on the Slavenkust or Slave Coast to acquire slaves for their New World colonies.  It was also the year of the supposed sale of the island of Manhattan to the Dutch by native inhabitants for the equivalent of 24 dollars of trade goods.  What is significant to Dorothy Creole's story is that by 1625, New Amsterdam was a place where Europeans, Native Americans and Africans had significant interaction.

New Amsterdam 
The colony was a business venture of the Dutch West India Company (WIC); and Dorothy Creole was a part of that business.  The agricultural profits of the DWIC came from New World products that relied upon slave labor from Africa.  The company's warehouses in Amsterdam, Europe, filled with tobacco, sugar and coffee that had been produced with slave labor from Africa and unloaded  in Europe from the holds of ships returning from the New World.  On Manhattan, Dorothy became a tiny link in the chain of the company business.

When Dorothy arrived in New Amsterdam, it was a village of thirty wooden houses clinging to the southern tip of Manhattan, today's financial capital of the world.  It was also the island at the center of corporate world, linking the New World with Africa and the European continent.

The DWIC had a lucrative monopoly on the Dutch North American fur trade with the Native Americans.  Beaver pelts were used for making broad-brimmed beaver hats which were warm and water repellent, as well as expensive status symbols.
    

The wealthy men in Rembrandt's Syndics of the Drapers' Guild wear hats made from beaver pelts from the New Amsterdam colony. The fur trade, crucial to the success of the Dutch colony, had been established by Juan (Jan) Rodriguez, the first known person of African descent to arrive on Manhattan.

Kieft's War, named for the DWIC Director-General, Willem Kieft (also known as the Wappinger War), between the Dutch and the local population  from 1643 to 1645, grew from Kieft's unauthorized order for an attack on the Lenape camps, in which the Dutch massacred native inhabitants. This unified the local Algonquian tribes against the Dutch, causing many attacks on both sides.  Dutch settlers began to return to the Netherlands, slowing the growth of the colony.

Half-free 
Part of Keift's solution was to use the African population as a buffer between the Indians and the Dutch.  At the height of the fighting, Kieft opened the frontier north of New Amsterdam for settlement by Blacks.  Company records show that in 1644, one Paulo d'Angola and other enslaved Africans petitioned the DWIC for their freedom, as well as the freedom of their wives.  The wife of Paulo d'Angola appears to be none other than Dorothy Creole.  Records of the colony show that the previous year, Dorothy had adopted a young Black child who had lost both his parents.  Keift conditionally granted the petition.  He conferred what was called "half-freedom," declaring them "free and at liberty on the same footing as other free people here in New Netherlands."  This group of former slaves was also granted title to land in the Dutch colony.  Only the names of the men appear in the records.  Some historians feel that half-freedom for the petitioners' wives came only when these men paid for the women's half-freedom.

These families received the right to own land north of the settlement to farm and settle.  Called the "Land of the Blacks" or the "Negro Frontier," this two-mile stretch from Canal Street to today's 34th Street was established as one of the first free Black communities in North America, clearly outside the boundaries of the colony.

Half-freedom was given by the DWIC with many conditions.  Men and women who were half-free paid an annual tax of "30 skepels (around 3/4 bushel) of maize, wheat, peas or beans and one fat hog.” Further, half-free residents of the Dutch colony had to work for the settlement when required. This work might include, for example, building the palisade at Wall Street in 1653 to defend the colony.  Like other defensive walls, the palisade also provided for the passage of people and goods.  Blacks thus often found themselves interacting between the Dutch and the native inhabitants.

Half-free men were required to serve in the colony's militia.  It is true that there conditions and contributions were often required by the city's free, white population.  However, offspring of half-free residents did not enjoy the same status as their parents.  They remained slaves of the DWIC, binding them in perpetuity to the company.

The land grant received by Dorothy Creole and Paulo d’Angola from eight to twelve acres, a sizable piece of property that would confer their status as among the largest black landowners in the entire history of New York City to this day.  This property would allow the couple to raise crops for sale and taxes.  They would have also had a kitchen garden for their own use and pastureland for animals.  Many Dutch resident planted orchards, and Dorothy and Paulo likely planted apple, peach, plum and cherry trees. The couple built their house themselves, using wood and thatch from resources on Manhattan island using the same materials as the Dutch citizens living in the city proper, south of the palisade at Wall Street.

The Journal of Jasper Danckaerts (1679-1680) describes this area and its inhabitants:

These negroes were formerly the proper slaves of the (West India) company, but, in consequence of the frequent changes and conquests of the country, they have obtained their freedom and settled themselves down where they have thought proper, and thus on this road, where they have ground enough to live on with their families.

The road formerly called the Negroes' Causeway  connected several farms in the Land of the Blacks with the settlement located south of the palisade at Wall Street.  It is located in today's Greenwich Village.   Minetta Lane is all that remains of a road that once ran alongside Minetta Creek. 

DWIC records have no mention of either Dorothy or Paulo until 1653.  In that year,  one Dorothy d’Angola, then a widow, marries Emanuel Pietersen.  Missing also is information on her adopted child or land and property that survived her demise. There is no record of her place of burial.  But we can contextualize Dorothy Creole's life and legacy in the history of the colony of New Amsterdam to try and fill in information where lacunae exist.

The DWIC did not approve of Willem Kieft's rule as director-general of New Amsterdam.  His conflict with local native groups was bad for the fur trade, which was the primary economic motor of the colony.  Called back to the Netherlands in disgrace, Kieft died in a shipwreck during his return journey.  His replacement, was Pieter Stuyvesant, a seasoned administrator and soldier, who was counted upon to renew the failing Dutch colony.

In 1664, Stuyvesant surrendered the colony to an English invasion force without firing a shot, an event which would lead to the outbreak of the Second Anglo-Dutch War. The settlement of New Amsterdam was renamed New York after the Duke of York. Over the following decades, the new colonial administration gradually eroded the rights of the Free Black population in New York, and after a 1712 slave rebellion, a series of slave codes were passed which forbade Black New Yorkers from owning property. It is likely that the farm owned by Dorothy and Paulo was confiscated as a result of the introduction of these codes.

See also
Juan Rodriguez

References 

People of New Netherland
17th-century African-American women
17th-century African-American people
Dutch slaves